Coimbatore–Jaipur Superfast Express is a Superfast Express weekly train run by Indian Railways between Coimbatore Main Junction in Tamil Nadu and Jaipur in Rajasthan.It runs with the numbers 12969/12970. It is now running with LHB coaches from January 2021.

Service and schedule
The train leaves Jaipur on every Tuesdays at 7.35pm and reaches Coimbatore on every Thursdays at 4.50pm.

Route and stations
This train passes through 37 intermediate stations including Sawai Madhopur, Kota, Nagda, Ujjain, Bhopal, Itarsi, Nagpur, Balharshah, Warangal, Vijayawada, Gudur, Chennai Central, Katpadi, Jolarpettai, Salem and Erode. It gets its reversal done three times in its journey at Sawai Madhopur, Nagda and at Chennai Central.

Coach and rake
 1 AC First Class Cum AC Two Tier
 2 AC Two Tier
 6 AC Three Tier
 6 Sleeper Class
 1 Pantry Car
 4 General Unreserved
 2 Generator Cars

It shares its rakes with
Jaipur - Chennai Central Express
Jaipur - Mysore Express

The train is pulled by Erode WAP-4, Vadodara WAP-4 and Bhagat Ki Kothi WDP-4B.

References

External links
 12969 Time Table
 12970 Time Table

Rail transport in Tamil Nadu
Express trains in India
Transport in Coimbatore
Transport in Jaipur
Railway services introduced in 1998